Bruno Fernandes das Dores de Souza (born 23 December 1984), known as Bruno Fernandes or Goleiro Bruno ('Goalkeeper Bruno'), is a Brazilian convicted murderer and professional footballer who played as a goalkeeper.

Between 2007 and 2009, he was a trophy-winning goalkeeper at the Brazilian club Flamengo. In 2010, he was charged with the assault, torture and murder of his extramarital girlfriend and mother of his youngest child. In 2013, he was found guilty of ordering her murder, hiding the body and kidnapping his baby son, and was sentenced to a 22-year jail term, but in February 2017, he was released pending an appeal. In April 2017, Brazil's Supreme Court ordered his re-arrest. In July 2019, he was released to serve partial house arrest, being able to work or train in the day, while having to return to his house for the night. He subsequently joined three football clubs; Poços de Caldas in 2019, Rio Branco Football Club in 2020, and Atlético Carioca in 2021.

Club career

Corinthians
In 2006, Bruno was signed by investment fund Media Sports Investments, which has been linked to various transactions with Atlético Mineiro; the deal was speculated to have been worth around €2 million, plus 15% on a future deal. He went on to sign a contract, until the end of the year, with Corinthians, then a partner of MSI. However, following manager Émerson Leão's continuous refusal to play Bruno over home-grown keeper Marcelo, Bruno became deeply unsatisfied. With no match played for Corinthians, he was loaned out to Flamengo.

Flamengo
At his new side, Bruno arrived in the same week Diego, the first team goalkeeper at the time, suffered an injury. He instantly replaced incumbent Diego as first choice goalkeeper. He made his début in a match against Internacional and then delivered some impressive performances, cementing his starting position between the posts for the rest of the season. In 2007, he became a fan favourite for his great showings, especially on penalties, by making three saves in the Rio de Janeiro State Championship 2007 finals against Botafogo, helping Flamengo become the champions. Throughout the year, it was speculated that Bruno would depart for Europe, with MSI wishing to cash-in on him, and the goalkeeper was linked with Barcelona.

For around €3 million, Flamengo sealed a permanent deal with Bruno in 2008, with the player stating his desire to be with the rubro-negro for the foreseeable future. Bruno scored his first professional goal on 23 April 2008, from a free kick, which led the way for a crucial 2–0 victory over Coronel Bolognesi in the Copa Libertadores. Bruno scored his second goal on 23 October 2008, in a penalty kick against Coritiba. He scored his third goal for Flamengo on 4 February 2009, in a free kick, against Mesquita.

After the retirement of Fábio Luciano, in May 2009, Bruno became team captain. On 12 July 2009, Bruno completed, against São Paulo, his 100th match for Flamengo in the Brazilian Série A, the game finished in a 2–2 draw.

His fourth career goal, this time from a free kick, was for Flamengo on 26 May 2010, in a Campeonato Brasileiro match which they lost 2–1 to Fluminense.

In July 2010, Flamengo announced the club had suspended Bruno's contract as a result of the murder investigation and the club lawyer would no longer act in his defence.

Boa Esporte
On 10 March 2017, shortly after leaving prison pending appeal, he signed for Boa Esporte a contract until 2019 and appeared five times before returning to prison. As a result, three sponsors of the club, CardioCenter, Nutrends Nutrition and Magsul, ended their partnerships with the club.

Pocos de Caldas
In October 2019, Bruno returned to football with the Pocos de Caldas club, playing in a friendly match against Independiente Juruaia; he declared that when "people here in Pocos de Caldas get to know the real Bruno, the human being that he is, then a lot of minds will be changed".

Rio Branco

In July 2020, Rio Branco Football Club announced that they had signed Bruno, prompting their club's women's team coach to quit in protest. Bruno played for Rio Branco in the Campeonato Brasileiro Série D.

Atlético Carioca
Atlético Carioca tried to sign Bruno, initially giving up in March 2021. In May 2021, Bruno announced his decision to retire from football to become an investor; however, within two weeks, he announced that he had signed with Atlético Carioca.

Murder, arrest and imprisonment

On 9 June 2010, the athlete's former mistress, Eliza Samudio, disappeared. While pregnant, she had claimed that Bruno was her child's father, which she could prove after her son was born. When he refused to support the child, Samudio had sued Bruno during a time when a lucrative transfer to AC Milan was being negotiated. After Samudio's disappearance, her child turned up with Bruno's wife. In July 2010, a Brazilian judge ordered Bruno's arrest. A 17-year old cousin of Fernandes de Souza told police that he had taken part in Samudio's abduction with his friend, Luiz Henrique Ferreira Romão. He also stated that Samudio was dead but did not say how she died, nor where her body was, and that Fernandes de Souza was the father of her baby, despite him being married. Flamengo suspended his contract with the club and their lawyers eventually did not represent him in court anymore. According to his accomplice Romão, Bruno tried to commit suicide twice, while in prison waiting for his trial to begin, but the Secretariat of Rio de Janeiro denied that Bruno had done so; it did report that he fainted once, due to low blood sugar levels.

In late July, he was formally charged with murder, kidnapping, hiding a body, forming a criminal gang (conspiracy) and corrupting minors. According to police, Bruno's teenage cousin stated that Samudio's body was cut up and some parts were fed to dogs, while other parts were buried under concrete. Bruno confessed to organizing the plot.

The case has led to debate in Brazil concerning misbehavior by professional athletes and growing crime against women. On 8 March 2013, he was sentenced to a 22-year jail term for the assault, torture and murder of his former girlfriend and mother of his youngest child.

Release and re-arrest
In February 2017, after Fernandes had served just six years and seven months in prison, his lawyers filed a petition of habeas corpus because of the slow processing of an appeal request. The petition was granted by the minister of the STF Marco Aurélio Mello and Bruno was released from jail pending an appeal. After his release, Bruno immediately received a number of contract offers and he accepted that from Boa Esporte Clube. Samudio's mother's suit demanding Bruno's return to prison because he posed a threat to her grandson was unsuccessful. In a media interview, de Souza said:

In April 2017, Brazil's supreme court ordered his re-arrest because the defence's legal team themselves were partly to blame for the delays in his appeal, and Bruno was imprisoned again.

Partial house arrest 
In July 2019, Bruno was released from prison to serve in a "semi-open" program for the rest of his sentence, where he could work or train in the day, while being under house arrest at night. The program was intended to have him return to jail each night, but Varginha Prison's inadequate facilities to accommodate the coming and going of detainees led to Bruno enjoying house arrest instead.

Career statistics

Club

according to combined sources on the Flamengo official website and Flaestatística.

In 2006 Bruno played for Atlético Mineiro in the Brazilian Série B.

Honours

Club
Flamengo
 Taça Guanabara: 2007, 2008
 Taça Rio: 2009
 Rio de Janeiro State League: 2007, 2008, 2009
 Brazilian Série A: 2009

References

External links

zerozero.pt 

1984 births
Living people
Brazilian footballers
Brazilian people convicted of murder
Association football goalkeepers
Campeonato Brasileiro Série A players
Clube Atlético Mineiro players
CR Flamengo footballers
People convicted of murder by Brazil
Sportspeople from Minas Gerais
Sport Club Corinthians Paulista players
Murder convictions without a body
Sportspeople convicted of murder